James Edward McConnell (1815–1883) was one of the first locomotive engineers of the London and North Western Railway (LNWR).  He was Locomotive Superintendent of the LNWR's Southern Division at Wolverton railway works from 1847 to 1862 and oversaw the design of the "Bloomer" and "Patent" locomotives. He was also one of the founding members of the Institution of Mechanical Engineers, and its first chairman, discussing the issue of an institute in 1846 at Bromsgrove.

Biography
McConnell was born at Fermoy, County Cork, Ireland, on 1 January 1815.

In July 1841 McConnell joined the Birmingham and Gloucester Railway as foreman of locomotives. 

Since the Rainhill Trials in 1829, it had been accepted that the smoke emitted by burning coal was a nuisance. Railway companies accepted the need to burn coke (a smokeless fuel) in their locomotives, but this was much more expensive than coal, and several locomotive engineers sought a method by which coal could be burned smokelessly. One such engineer was McConnell, who designed a boiler suitable for coal in 1852.

McConnell died at Great Missenden, Buckinghamshire, England, on 11 June 1883.

See also
 Locomotives of the London and North Western Railway

Notes

Sources

 Ian Allan ABC of British Railways Locomotives, January 1961, part 3, page 58
 
 Jack, Harry (2001): Locomotives of the LNWR Southern Division – London & Birmingham Railway and Wolverton Locomotive Works. Sawtry, RCTS. 
 

 Glossary for the LNWR Society
 steamindex.com

Further reading
 
     

1815 births
1883 deaths
People from County Cork
London and North Western Railway people
Locomotive builders and designers
British railway mechanical engineers
People from Fermoy
Fellows of the Institution of Mechanical Engineers